John Bob Nwannunu was elected Senator for the Abia Central constituency of Abia State, Nigeria at the start of the Nigerian Fourth Republic, running on the All People's Party (APP) platform. He took office on 29 May 1999.
 
After taking his seat in the Senate he was appointed to committees on Selection, Petroleum, Communication, Power & Steel and Agriculture.
He was the deputy APP leader in the Senate.
In January 2001, speaking of a proposed cabinet shakeup by President Olusegun Obasanjo, he said that Obasanjo's first ministerial team had failed to perform in office because they had their eyes on subsequent political careers.

References

Members of the Senate (Nigeria)
Living people
People from Abia State
All People's Party (Nigeria) politicians
20th-century Nigerian politicians
21st-century Nigerian politicians
Year of birth missing (living people)